Ogresuchus is an extinct sebecid known from the Upper Cretaceous (Maastrichtian stage) Tremp Formation in Spain. It is the oldest known member of the Sebecidae and it is also the only known Mesozoic sebecid. The type species, O. furatus, was named in 2020.

Discovery and naming
The holotype was discovered in July 2013 at the Mirador del Cretaci site, but it was stolen before palaeontologists could excavate it. After several weeks of searching, the Mossos d'Esquadra Historical Heritage Unit tracked down the stolen specimen and the thief was promptly arrested. The holotype was in a rather precarious state of conservation until it was correctly prepared several years later. It was named Ogresuchus furatus in 2020 and the holotype is now on display at the Coll de Nargó Dinosaur Museum (Dinosfera). The generic name means "Ogre crocodile", referring to its possible diet of infant sauropods, which the specific name is derived from a Latin word being "to be stolen", referring to the theft of the specimen.

References

External links
 Enrico de Lazaro: Small Cretaceous Crocodile May Have Preyed on Baby Titanosaurs. On: sci-news. Oct 5, 2020
 A. G. Sellés et al. 2020. A small Cretaceous crocodyliform in a dinosaur nesting ground and the origin of sebecids. In: Sci Rep 10, 15293; 17 September 2020; doi:10.1038/s41598-020-71975-y

Sebecids
Prehistoric pseudosuchian genera
Maastrichtian life
Cretaceous Spain
Fossils of Spain
Tremp Formation
Fossil taxa described in 2020